Ashton is a given name of English origin. It is derived from the surname, itself a place name meaning "ash tree town."

The name is in use for both boys and girls in the United States. Ashton was used far more often for American females from years 1986–1997. The popularity for girls was from the Terri Garber character "Ashton Main" on 1985's North and South TV miniseries. Since Ashton Kutcher's debut on television and film in the late 1990s, the name is now in favor more for boys, as it was always before 1986. Ashton was the 124th most popular name for American boys born in 2007. It was the 778th most popular name for American girls in 2005, the last year it was ranked among the top 1,000 names. Ashton was ranked among the top 100 names for boys in England and Wales in 2007 and in British Columbia, Canada and New South Wales, Australia in 2005 and 2006.

Popular nicknames include Ash and Ashy.

People with the given name "Ashton" include

A
Ashton Agar (born 1993), Australian cricketer
Ashton Applewhite (born 1952), American writer
Ashton Aylworth (??–1602), English politician

B
Ashton Baumann (born 1993), Canadian swimmer
Ashton Bell (born 1999), Canadian ice hockey player
Ashton Bennett (born 1988), Jamaican footballer

C
Ashton Calvert (1945–2007), Australian public servant
Ashton Carter (1954–2022), American physicist and politician
Ashton Chen (born 1988), Chinese actor
Ashton Clemmons (born 1983), American politician
Ashton B. Collins Sr. (1885–1976), American inventor
Ashton Constant (born 1983), South African rugby union footballer
Ashton Cyrillien (born 1975), Antiguan footballer

D
Ashton Dovell (1885–1949), American politician
Ashton Dulin (born 1997), American football player

E
Ashton Eaton (born 1988), American decathlete
Ashton F. Embry (born 1946), Canadian scientist

G
Ashton Galpin (born 1950), South African cricketer
Ashton Gibbs (born 1990), American basketball player
Ashton Golding (born 1996), Jamaican rugby league footballer
Ashton Götz (born 1993), German footballer
Ashton Goudeau (born 1992), American baseball player
Ashton Griffin (born 1989), American poker player

H
Ashton Hagans (born 1999), American basketball player
Ashton Hams (born 1986), Australian rules footballer
Ashton Hawkins (1937–2022), American lawyer
Ashton Hayward (born 1969), American politician and real estate developer
Ashton Hewitt (born 1994), Welsh rugby union footballer
Ashton Higgins (born 2002), American stock car racing driver
Ashton Hill (born 1995), Australian rules footballer
Ashton Holmes (born 1978), American actor
Ashton Hurn (born 1990/1991), Australian politician

I
Ashton Irwin (born 1994), Australian musician

J
Ashton Jones (1896–1979), American minister

K
Ashton Kutcher (born 1978), American actor

L
Ashton Lambie (born 1990), American cyclist
Ashton Lewis Jr. (born 1972), American stock car racing
Ashton Lever (1729–1788), English collector
Ashton Lister (1845–1929), British politician
Ashton Locklear (born 1998), American gymnast

M
Ashton Michael (born 1982), American fashion designer
Ashton Mitchell (born 1988), American basketball player
Ashton Nicholas Every Mosley (1792–1875), English sheriff

N
Ashton Nichols (born 1953), American professor
Ashton Nyte, South African singer

O
Ashton Oxenden (1808–1892), Canadian bishop

P
Ashton Pankey (born 1992), American basketball player

R
Ashton Rome (born 1985), Canadian ice hockey player
Ashton Roskill (1902–1992), British judge

S
Ashton C. Shallenberger (1862–1938), American politician
Ashton Sanborn (1882–1970), American archaeologist
Ashton Sanders (born 1995), American actor
Ashton Sautner (born 1994), Canadian ice hockey player
Ashton Shepherd (born 1986), American singer-songwriter
Ashton Sims (born 1985), Fijian rugby league footballer
Ashton Smith (born 1962), American voice actor
Ashton Smith (wrestler) (born 1988), English professional wrestler
Ashton Stevens (1872–1951), American journalist

T
Ashton Turner (born 1993), Australian cricketer

W
Ashton Wade (1898–1996), British army officer
Ashton Hilliard Williams (1891–1962), American judge

Y
Ashton Youboty (born 1984), Liberian-American football player

Z
Ashton Chen Yong Zhao (born 1989), Singaporean badminton player

See also
Ashton (surname), a page for people with the surname "Ashton"
Ashton (disambiguation), a disambiguation page for "Ashton"

References

English given names
English masculine given names